The 1998–99 Georgetown Hoyas men's basketball team represented Georgetown University in the 1998–99 NCAA Division I college basketball season. They were coached by John Thompson, in his 27th season as head coach until January 8, 1999, when he resigned and Craig Esherick succeeded him. The Hoyas played most of their home games at the MCI Center in Washington, DC, although they played one home game at McDonough Gymnasium on the Georgetown campus. They were members of the Big East Conference and finished the season 15–16, 6–12 in Big East play. They advanced to the quarterfinals of the 1999 Big East men's basketball tournament before losing to Miami. Not invited to the NCAA Division I men's basketball tournament for the second year in a row, they instead appeared in the 1999 National Invitation Tournament (NIT) – their second consecutive appearance in the NIT – and lost to Princeton in the first round. Georgetown finished with its first losing record since the 1972–73 season.

Season recap

Playing the previous season with a roster depleted by transfers, injuries, and point guard Victor Pages early departure for a professional career, Georgetown in 1997–98 had had its least successful season since 1973–74. The Hoyas began to rebuild their roster this year.

Guard Anthony Perry sat out his freshman year because the National Collegiate Athletic Association (NCAA) had ruled that a computer science class he had taken in high school was insufficient as a core requirement, rendering him academically ineligible for 1997–98. He finally joined the team this season as a sophomore and started all 31 of the teams games, scoring in double figures in 22 of the first 24 games of the year, including 26 points in a game against Syracuse and 24 against Connecticut. He suffered an ankle injury that reduced his performance as the season wore on, and he shot only 20-for-83 (24.1%) from the field to finish the year. Despite his late-season shooting woes, he finished his sophomore year as Georgetowns top scorer for the season, averaging 14.0 points per game.

Freshman guard Kevin Braswell was another newcomer to the team. He started all 31 games – in fact, he would start all 128 games of his collegiate career – and immediately emerged as a prodigious shooter, averaging one shot every 25 seconds and 17.6 points per game during the first five games of the year. During the season as a whole, he scored in double figures 23 times, including four games in which he scored 20 or more points and a season-high 29 points against Georgia State, and he averaged 13.5 points per game for the year. Despite his overall scoring prowess, he played inconsistently; his 441 field goal attempts were second only to Allen Iverson among Georgetown freshman, but he shot only 33 percent from the field in contrast to Iversons 39 percent. In one of his more notable slumps, he shot only 24.5 percent from the field in three straight losses over a one-week period at the end of 1998 and beginning of 1999, going 7-for-18 (38.9%) against Miami on December 30, 4-for-18 (22.2%) at top-ranked Connecticut on January 2, and 2-for-17 (11.8%) at Seton Hall on January 4.

As a freshman the previous season, guard Nat Burton had been thrust into a starting role as Georgetowns roster ran low on players. Now a sophomore, Burton played in 30 of the teams 31 games and started 28 of them. Although he only shot around 25 percent from beyond the three-point line, he was an aggressive rebounder and inside shooter, and he scored in double figures 12 times in the teams final 14 games. He finished third in scoring on the team, averaging 11.4 points and 4.9 rebounds per game.

After suffering a wrist injury and missing all but the first six games of the previous season, sophomore center Ruben Boumtje-Boumtje returned to action but got off to a slow start, scoring only six field goals in his first four games of the season. He started all 31 games and improved as the season wore on, with five double-doubles, among them a 15-point, 13-rebound performance in a win over Pittsburgh. He finished second in rebounding and fourth in scoring for the team, averaging 8.5 points per game for the year. He blocked 89 shots, the third in history among Georgetown sophomores behind only Patrick Ewing and Alonzo Mourning.

After coaching a last game for Georgetown at Seton Hall on January 4, 1999, head coach John Thompson, Jr., abruptly resigned and retired on January 8, 1999, after 26½ seasons at the helm, citing his impending divorce and other family issues and rejecting the idea posed by friends of leaving the team only temporarily for a sabbatical. Assistant coach Craig Esherick, a reserve guard for Georgetown from 1974 to 1978 who had returned as an assistant coach in 1982 and served in that capacity for 17½ seasons, took over, beginning his own five-and-a-half-season run as head coach. Eshericks first game as head coach was against Providence on January 9, 1999.

Twenty-two days after Thompsons resignation, Georgetown made one of the most remarkable comebacks in school history, albeit in a losing cause. On January 30, 1999, the Hoyas faced Villanova at First Union Center in Philadelphia, Pennsylvania, and missed their first ten shots to fall behind the Wildcats 13–0. The Hoyas closed to a 39–30 deficit at halftime, but in the second half Villanova opened with a 16–8 run that left Georgetown trailing 55–38 with 13:55 left to play. With Nat Burton scoring 11 of his game-high 21 points, Georgetown then went on a 19–0 run of its own that gave the Hoyas a 57–55 lead. Eleven ties and fourteen lead changes ensued as three of Georgetowns "big men" fouled out. The game went into overtime, and then into a second overtime. With 14 seconds left in the second overtime and Georgetown leading 90–87, Anthony Perry missed a free throw, and Villanovas Howard Brown scored a 22-foot (6.7-meter) three-point shot to tie the game at 90–90 with 2.6 seconds left. Burton tried to call a time-out, but the officials did not see him, and when Georgetown senior guard-forward Daymond Jackson tried to pass the ball to Perry,  Villanovas Brooks Sales intercepted the pass and flipped the ball to Jermaine Medley, who scored a winning 28-foot (8.5-meter) three-pointer at the buzzer to give the Wildcats a 93–90 win.

The team opened the season 6–2 but struggled in conference play, posting a 14–14 record overall, 6–12 in the Big East. Its 10th-place finish in the conference earned it a No. 10 seed in the 1999 Big East tournament. In the first round, the Hoyas upset seventh-seeded Providence, but they fell to second-seeded Miami in the quarterfinals.

With a 15–15 record after the tournament, Georgetown missed the NCAA tournament for the second year in a row, the first time the school had missed the tournament for two consecutive seasons since the 1976–77 and 1977–78 seasons. For the second straight year, the Hoyas accepted an invitation to the National Invitation Tournament (NIT). They lost at Princeton in the first round, bringing their season to the end. The 15–16 record they posted was Georgetowns first losing season since 1972–73.

Roster
Source

Rankings

The team was not ranked in the Top 25 in the AP Poll at any time. It also was not ranked in the Top 25 in the final or postseason Coaches' Poll; its Coaches' Poll rankings during the rest of the season are not available.

1998–99 Schedule and results
Sources
 All times are Eastern

|-
!colspan=9 style="background:#002147; color:#8D817B;"| Preseason

|-
!colspan=9 style="background:#002147; color:#8D817B;"| Regular Season

|-
!colspan=9 style="background:#002147; color:#8D817B;"| Big East tournament

|-
!colspan=9 style="background:#002147; color:#8D817B;"| National Invitation Tournament

References

Georgetown Hoyas men's basketball seasons
Georgetown Hoyas
Georgetown
Georgetown Hoyas men's basketball team
Georgetown Hoyas men's basketball team